Basil Gomez is an American professor of fluvial geomorphology whose works have been published in such journals as Earth Surface Processes and Landforms, Water Resources Research, the Journal of Geology and others.

Early life and career
In 1977 he obtained his BSc degree from the Plymouth University and then got a Ph.D. from the University of Southampton in 1981. Three years later he got a visiting fellowship to the University of British Columbia and by 1987 became a visiting fellow at the University of Tsukuba in Japan. In 1988 he was a lecturer at both the University of Oxford and Jesus and St. Catherine's Colleges where he taught physical geography. Currently he works at the Indiana State University and considered to be an adjunct professor at the University of Hawaii. He also works as an editor of the Annals of the Association of American Geographers and is a member of the Basin Research advisory board. His other interests include geoarchaeology, especially Roman Cyprus and late Bronze Age periods.

His academic career began in 1981 in Valais, Switzerland where he studied moraines at Glacier de Tsijiore Nouve.

References

External links

20th-century births
Living people
American geomorphologists
Alumni of the University of Southampton
Academics of the University of Oxford
Indiana State University faculty
Academic staff of the University of British Columbia
University of Hawaiʻi faculty
Academic staff of the University of Tsukuba
Year of birth missing (living people)
Alumni_of_the_University_of_Plymouth
People associated with St Catherine's College, Oxford